Rinaldo Fidel Brédice (11 September 1932 – 15 April 2018) was an Argentine Roman Catholic bishop.

Brédice was born in Argentina and was ordained to the priesthood in 1956. He served as bishop of the Roman Catholic Diocese of Santa Rosa in Argentina from 1992 to 2008.

Notes

External links

1932 births
2018 deaths
20th-century Roman Catholic bishops in Argentina
21st-century Roman Catholic bishops in Argentina
Roman Catholic bishops of Santa Rosa in Argentina